Concho County is a county located on the Edwards Plateau in the U.S. state of Texas. As of the 2020 census, the population was 3,303. Its county seat is Paint Rock. The county was founded in 1858 and later organized in 1879. It is named for the Concho River.

History

Through the 1800s, Paleo-Indians lived in the county and left behind archaeological remains of a burned-rock midden. Athabascan-speaking Indians associated with the prehorse Plains culture live in this part of Texas. Later native inhabitants include Jumano, Tonkawa, Comanche and Lipan Apache.

In 1847, John O. Meusebach sent surveyors into the area. In 1849, Robert Simpson Neighbors lead a small expedition through the area.

The Texas Legislature formed Concho County from Bexar County in 1858.

In 1874, Ranald S. Mackenzie led a campaign to drive out remaining native peoples and established the Mackenzie Trail. The county seat was formally established and named Paint Rock after the nearby pictographs. The Eden community was established in 1882. In 1909, the community of Lowake community was established.

Railroad development 
Railroads came to the county first in 1910, with the Concho, San Saba and Llano Valley railroad being completed to Paint Rock. The Fort Worth and Rio Grande Railway is completed across the southeastern corner of the county in 1911, and the Gulf, Colorado and Santa Fe railroad finished a line to Eden in 1912.

By 1930, the area had 449 owner-operated farms and 682 tenant-operated farms, of whom 619 were sharecroppers.

In 1940, Concho County became part of a soil-conservation district. In 1985, the Texas Water Commission granted permission to impound  of water on the Colorado River at Stacy, to create the O. H. Ivie Reservoir.

As of 1988, Concho County was the leading sheep-producing county in Texas.

Geography

Major highways
  U.S. Highway 83
  U.S. Highway 87
  State Highway 153
  State Highway 206

Adjacent counties
 Runnels County (north)
 Coleman County (northeast)
 McCulloch County (east)
 Menard County (south)
 Schleicher County (southwest)
 Tom Green County (west)

Demographics

Note: the US Census treats Hispanic/Latino as an ethnic category. This table excludes Latinos from the racial categories and assigns them to a separate category. Hispanics/Latinos can be of any race.

As of the census of 2000, 3,966 people, 1,058 households, and 757 families resided in the county.  The population density was 4 people per square mile (2/km2).  There were 1,488 housing units at an average density of 2 per square mile (1/km2).  The racial makeup of the county was 88.20% White, 0.98% Black or African American, 0.48% Native American, 0.08% Asian, 0.10% Pacific Islander, 8.93% from other races, and 1.24% from two or more races.  About 41.33% of the population were Hispanics or Latinos of any race.

Of the 1,058 households, 29.80% had children under the age of 18 living with them, 59.40% were married couples living together, 9.70% had a female householder with no husband present, and 28.40% were not families. About 26.60% of all households were made up of individuals, and 14.20% had someone living alone who was 65 years of age or older.  The average household size was 2.45 and the average family size was 2.97.

In the county, the population was distributed as 16.10% under the age of 18, 10.40% from 18 to 24, 38.20% from 25 to 44, 21.50% from 45 to 64, and 13.80% who were 65 years of age or older.  The median age was 36 years. For every 100 females, there were 181.30 males.  For every 100 females age 18 and over, there were 209.90 males.

The median income for a household in the county was $31,313, and for a family was $36,894. Males had a median income of $20,750 versus $21,458 for females. The per capita income for the county was $15,727.  About 7.50% of families and 11.90% of the population were below the poverty line, including 15.80% of those under age 18 and 14.20% of those age 65 or over.

Concho County has the third-highest proportion of prison inmates amongst its residents of any county equivalent in the United States, behind Crowley County, Colorado and Louisiana's West Feliciana Parish. As a result, the county has the highest gender ratio in the United States with 232 men to every 100 women.

Communities

City
 Eden

Town
 Paint Rock (county seat)

Unincorporated communities
 Eola
 Lowake
 Millersview

In popular culture
The 1968 movie Journey to Shiloh features a group known as the "Concho County Comanches," and mentions neighboring Menard County.

Politics

See also

 National Register of Historic Places listings in Concho County, Texas
 Recorded Texas Historic Landmarks in Concho County

References

External links

 Concho County government’s website
 Concho County in Handbook of Texas Online at the University of Texas

 
1879 establishments in Texas
Populated places established in 1879